Vasily Pavlovich Tikhonov (born 19 November 1960) is a Soviet rower. He is married to Irina Kalimbet who like him competed at the 1988 Summer Olympics in rowing. Their twin daughters Anastasia and Elizaveta are both international rowers.

References 

1960 births
Living people
Russian male rowers
Soviet male rowers
Rowers at the 1988 Summer Olympics
Rowers at the 1992 Summer Olympics
Olympic silver medalists for the Soviet Union
Olympic rowers of the Soviet Union
Olympic rowers of the Unified Team
Olympic medalists in rowing
Medalists at the 1988 Summer Olympics